The women's team at the 2021 Asian Table Tennis Championships in Doha was held at Lusail Sports Arena from 28 September to 1 October 2021.

System of play 
Team events will be divided into two divisions, namely the Champion Division and the First Division.

Based on the number of entries, all teams excluding the top 6 teams from the last Asian Championships will be divided into groups of 3 or 4 teams. In the first stage, all groups play in a round robin system to determine their positions. In the second stage, group winners play in a progressive knock-out system to determine the top 2 teams (winner and runner-up) that directly enter the Champion Division. Other teams play in a progressive knock-out system to decide their final positions.

Champion Division consists of top 6 teams from the last Asian Championships in 2019 and the top 2 teams from the 1st Division. Play starts directly in a progressive knock-out system to determine the final positions.

Match order in team events are A vs X, B vs Y, C vs Z, A vs Y, B vs X. All matches will be played in best of five (5) games.

Schedule 
All times are Arabia Standard Time (UTC+03:00)

First division

Group 1

Group 2

Group 3

Group 4

Main bracket

11th place bracket

15th place bracket

Champion division

Main bracket 
Source:

5th place bracket 

Source:

Final standings

References 

2021 Asian Table Tennis Championships